Enda Kenny (born 24 April 1951) is an Irish former Fine Gael politician who served as Taoiseach from 2011 to 2017, Leader of Fine Gael from 2002 to 2017, Minister for Defence from May to July 2014 and 2016 to 2017, Leader of the Opposition from 2002 to 2011, Minister for Tourism and Trade from 1994 to 1997 and Minister of State at the Department of Labour and Department of Education with responsibility for Youth Affairs from 1986 to 1987. He served as Teachta Dála (TD) for Mayo West from 1975 to 1997 and for Mayo from 1997 to 2020.

Kenny led Fine Gael to a historic victory at the 2011 general election, his party becoming the largest in the country for the first time, forming a coalition government with the Labour Party on 9 March 2011. He subsequently became the first Fine Gael member to be elected Taoiseach for a second consecutive term on 6 May 2016, after two months of negotiations, following the 2016 election, forming a Fine Gael-led minority government. He was the first Taoiseach from Fine Gael since John Bruton (1994–1997), and the first Leader of Fine Gael to win a general election since Garret FitzGerald in 1982. He became the longest-serving Fine Gael Taoiseach in April 2017.

Kenny stepped down as Leader of Fine Gael on 2 June 2017, and announced he would resign as Taoiseach once a new leader was chosen in early June. In the following leadership election, the then Minister for Social Protection, Leo Varadkar, was elected to succeed him as Leader of Fine Gael. Kenny tendered his resignation as Taoiseach on 13 June 2017, and was succeeded by Varadkar the following day. On 5 November 2017, Kenny announced that he would not contest the following general election.

Early life
Kenny was born in 1951 in Derrycoosh, Islandeady, near Castlebar, County Mayo, the third child of five of Mary Eithne (McGinley) and Henry Kenny. He was educated locally at St Patrick's National School, Cornanool N.S, Leitir N.S and at St. Gerald's College, Castlebar. He attended St Patrick's College, Dublin, qualifying as a national teacher and was an undergraduate student at University College Galway. He worked as a primary school teacher for four years. He also played football for his local club Islandeady GAA.

Career

Early years in Dáil Éireann (1975–1994)
Kenny was exposed to politics from an early age, following his father Henry Kenny, becoming a Fine Gael TD in 1954. In the early 1970s, he became directly involved in politics when he started helping his father with constituency clinics. In 1975, Henry Kenny (who was at this stage a Parliamentary Secretary in the government) died after a short battle with cancer. Fine Gael wanted one of his sons to stand as their candidate at the subsequent by-election, and so Enda Kenny was chosen. He was elected on the first count with 52% of the vote, and thus became the youngest member of the 20th Dáil, aged 24.

Kenny remained on the backbenches for almost a decade. He was appointed party spokesperson firstly on Youth Affairs and Sport, then Western Development; however, he failed to build a national profile as he concentrated more on constituency matters. Kenny was left out in the cold when Garret FitzGerald became Taoiseach for the first time in 1981, and again in 1982. He was, however, appointed as a member of the Fine Gael delegation at the New Ireland Forum in 1983. He later served on the British-Irish Parliamentary Association. In 1986, he became a Minister of State at the Department of Labour and Department of Education with responsibility for Youth Affairs. Fine Gael lost the 1987 general election, resulting in Kenny and Fine Gael being on the opposition benches for the next seven years. In spite of this, his national profile was raised as he served in a number of positions on the party's front bench, including Education, Arts, Heritage, Gaeltacht, and the Islands. He was also the Fine Gael Chief Whip for a short period.

Minister for Tourism (1994–1997)
In late 1994, the Fianna Fáil–Labour Party government collapsed; however, no general election was called. Instead, a Fine Gael–Labour Party–Democratic Left "Rainbow Coalition" came to power. Kenny, as Fine Gael chief whip, was a key member of the team, which negotiated the programme for government with the other parties prior to the formation of the new government. Under Taoiseach John Bruton, Kenny joined the cabinet and was appointed Minister for Tourism and Trade. During his tenure as Minister, Ireland saw a significant growth in the tourism sector and in its international trade position. As Minister, he chaired the European Union Council of Trade Ministers, during Ireland's six-month Presidency of the European Council, as well as co-chairing a round of the World Trade Organization talks in 1996. Among Kenny's other achievements were the rejuvenation of the Saint Patrick's Day parade in Dublin, and the successful negotiations to bring a stage of the 1998 Tour de France to Ireland. In 1997, the government was defeated at the general election and Kenny returned to the opposition benches.

Opposition (1997–2002)

Fine Gael leadership elections

2001

John Bruton resigned as leader of Fine Gael in 2001, following a vote of no confidence in his ability. Kenny stood in the subsequent leadership election, promising to "electrify the party". In the final ballot it was Michael Noonan who emerged victorious (it is Fine Gael's custom not to publish ballot results for leadership elections). Noonan did not give a spokesperson's assignment to Kenny; this led him to accuse Noonan of sending a "dangerous message".

2002

At the 2002 general election, Fine Gael suffered its worst electoral performance ever, losing 23 seats, a figure larger than expected, with its share of the vote down 5%. Kenny himself came close to losing his seat, and even went so far as to prepare a concession speech. In the end he won the third seat in the five-seat constituency. Noonan resigned as Fine Gael leader on the night of the result, an action which triggered another leadership election. Protest meetings were held by members of the party against the speed with which the leadership election had been called and the failure to broaden the franchise to the membership. It was suggested that it was foolish to choose a leader before conducting an electoral post-mortem.

Kenny once again contested the leadership and emerged successful on that occasion.

Racist remarks
In September 2002, Kenny was accused of making racist remarks after he used the word "nigger" in a joke relating to Patrice Lumumba, the assassinated first Prime Minister of the Democratic Republic of the Congo. Kenny wanted the incident to be suppressed, and specifically asked journalists not to cite it, though the Sunday Independent newspaper reported his "chortling repetition of the inflammatory word". He was subsequently condemned by race campaigners at home and abroad. Matters were made worse when it emerged that several of Lumumba's relatives, including a son and several grandchildren, lived in Tallaght.

Kenny apologised unreservedly but insisted that there was no racist intent, and that he was merely quoting what a Moroccan barman had once said, while reminiscing about an incident he had witnessed in the company of his friend David Molony, whose sudden death had recently occurred. However, what he said was widely seen as politically indefensible, as a story that should not have been told in the company of reporters by someone hoping to become the next Taoiseach.

Leader of the Opposition (2002–2011)
Fine Gael out-performed expectations at the 2004 Local and European elections, which saw Fine Gael increase its representation from 4 MEPs of 15 from Ireland, to 5 from 13. This was the first time Fine Gael had ever defeated Fianna Fáil in a national election, as well as the first time Fianna Fáil had failed to finish first in a national election since its second place in the 1927 general election behind Cumann na nGaedheal, Fine Gael's immediate predecessor.

In July 2005, five men from the north of Kenny's Mayo constituency were jailed over their opposition to the Fianna Fáil-led government's plans for the Corrib gas project. One of the men, Philip McGrath, worked for Kenny as an election agent for Rossport during general elections. Unlike his fellow Mayo Fine Gael TD, Michael Ring, Kenny was cautious about backing the men's stance (Ring would later be forced to adopt the same policy). The Shell to Sea campaign that was founded to help release the men and get the government to change its mind shut down work on the project for fifteen months. When Gardaí were brought in to remove protesters with tactics that saw many hospitalised, Kenny said: "The law must be obeyed."

In November 2005, Kenny called for the abolition of compulsory Irish for the Leaving Certificate examinations. This was opposed by all the major Irish language organisations. In March 2006, he was elected vice-president of the European People's Party (EPP), the largest European political group to which Fine Gael is affiliated. In his speech to the EPP, he stated that Fine Gael would be in government in Ireland within two years.

During the first half of 2006, Kenny went aggressively after a more populist line on the cost of immigration, street crime, paedophilia and homeowners' rights. A graphic description of a mugging he had experienced was given to the Dáil, in the context of a crime discussion, only for it to be revealed a day later that the incident had occurred in Kenya, not in Ireland.

Under Kenny, Fine Gael agreed to enter a pre-election pact with the Labour Party, to offer the electorate an alternative coalition government at the 2007 general election held on 24 May 2007. The so-called Mullingar Accord was agreed in September 2004, following the European and local elections that year. The Green Party also signalled via the media to be in favour of membership of such a coalition government after the election. However, it would not commit to an agreement before polling day.

Kenny's leadership attempted to define Fine Gael as a party of the progressive centre. Its policy initiatives concentrated on value for money, consumer rights, civil partnerships, reform of public spending, reward and enterprise and preventative health care policy. The party sought to retake its former mantle as the law-and-order and a party committed to defending the institutions of the state. At the Fine Gael Ardfheis in March 2007, Kenny outlined his platform for the forthcoming general election entitled the "Contract for a Better Ireland". The main aspects of this "contract" included: 2,300 more hospital beds, 2,000 more Gardaí, tougher jail sentences and tougher bail for criminals, free health insurance for all children under 16 and lower income tax. Bertie Ahern was perceived by many to have comfortably beaten Kenny in the pre-election Leaders' debate. When the votes were counted it emerged that Fine Gael had made large gains, increasing its number of seats by twenty, to give a total of 51 seats in the new Dáil. However, Labour and the Greens failed to make gains, leaving Kenny's "Alliance for Change" short of a majority. Despite predictions to the contrary, the Fianna Fáil vote recovered sufficiently to bring it to 78 seats, and a third term in government for Ahern.

Responding to the banking crisis in County Cork, on 15 February 2009, Kenny asked the entire board of the Central Bank of Ireland's Financial Regulation section to resign.

2010 challenge to leadership
An opinion poll published in The Irish Times on 10 June 2010 triggered a challenge to Kenny's leadership of the party. The Ipsos MRBI poll indicated that the Labour Party had become the most popular political party in the country for the first time, and also showed a drop in backing for Fianna Fáil and Fine Gael, and for their leaders. It showed a five-point drop in Fianna Fáil support since January 2010, leaving that party on 17%, Fine Gael down four points to 28%, and Labour up eight points to 32%. Satisfaction with Kenny's leadership dropped 7% to 24%.

Following the failure of the party's deputy leader Richard Bruton to support him, he was dismissed by Kenny on 14 June 2010. He also tabled a motion of confidence in his leadership, to be held on 17 June 2010. On the following day it was revealed that nine members of the Fine Gael frontbench did not have confidence in Kenny to lead their party – composed of Simon Coveney, Denis Naughten, Olwyn Enright, Olivia Mitchell, Fergus O'Dowd, Michael Creed, Billy Timmins, Leo Varadkar and Brian Hayes. Denis Naughten said frontbench members did not have Kenny's support and would like him to withdraw his motion of confidence and stand down in the interest of the party.

In December 2008, Vincent Browne criticised Kenny in The Irish Times for not having a grasp of the issues, notably of economic issues.

The motion of confidence in Kenny was passed. He announced a major reshuffle of his party's front bench on 1 July 2010, re-appointing Bruton, Coveney, O'Dowd, and Varadkar.

2011 general election
At the start of the 2011 general election campaign, Kenny said Fine Gael recognised the importance of "the giving of hope and confidence to people through the taxation system", when speaking to reporters outside party election headquarters in Dublin. "The Fine Gael party in this election is the only party that is categorically saying that there will not be any increase in income tax over our period in government", he said. He said the country needed strong government and not an administration that depended on the support of Independents. "I think that this is a time for courageous and strong government. It is not a time for government that might self-combust or that would be dependent on the whim of any mercenary Independents. This is a judgment call for the people."

There was several leaders debates on television during the campaign. There were, uniquely, three debates on stations TV3, RTÉ and TG4, between Enda Kenny, Michaél Martin and Eamon Gilmore, and a five-way leaders' debate on RTÉ which also included Gerry Adams and John Gormley, along with the other participants from the three-way debates.

Kenny, however, refused to participate in the three-way leaders' debate proposed by TV3, stating his unhappiness that Vincent Browne was to chair the debate. Browne is a well-known critic of Fine Gael and Kenny. In 1982, Browne appeared on The Late Late Show where he poured scorn on Kenny, claiming he was "purporting" to be a TD. In October 2010, Browne was forced to make a public apology to Kenny after jokingly asking whether Fine Gael was requesting that he go into a darkroom with a gun and a bottle of whisky. This was in reference to Fine Gael's position in the polls, where they were in second place to Labour, and a previous leadership challenge to Kenny by Richard Bruton. Kenny refused to appear on the leaders debate despite an offer by Browne to be replaced by a different moderator for the debate if Kenny would appear.

Kenny participated in a three-party leader debate on RTÉ moderated by Miriam O'Callaghan, and also in a five-way debate on RTÉ; this was a new format, involving all party leaders of the outgoing Dáil, including Kenny, moderated by Pat Kenny.

He participated in a three-way debate in the Irish language with Micheál Martin and Eamon Gilmore on TG4.

On 14 February 2011, Kenny met German Chancellor Angela Merkel to discuss the Irish economy. Kenny and Merkel have close political ties because Merkel's CDU party and Fine Gael are both members of the centre-right European People's Party (EPP), and seating at EPP meetings is arranged by alphabetical order of surname. The close relationship between these two leaders is illustrated further by the fact that Angela Merkel also backed Enda Kenny and Fine Gael during the 2007 election.

Opinion polls of 23 February 2011, sponsored by Paddy Power, the Irish Independent, and The Irish Times suggested that Kenny would lead Fine Gael to its largest total of seats to date in the 31st Dáil, and that he would be elected Taoiseach.

In the election, Kenny led Fine Gael to a decisive victory. The party won 76 seats, the most in its 78-year history, becoming the largest party in the Dáil for the first time. Meanwhile, Fianna Fáil suffered the worst defeat of a sitting government in the history of the Irish state, its representation being reduced by 75%. Kenny himself topped the poll in his Mayo constituency and uniquely three others from Fine Gael were elected alongside Kenny. At a victory party in Dublin, Kenny declared Fine Gael had "a massive endorsement" to govern, and the election marked "a transformative moment in Ireland's history". Later, he told RTÉ that he fully expected to become Taoiseach after what he called "a democratic revolution at the ballot box". While there was some talk that Fine Gael would govern alone as a minority government, senior Fine Gael leaders indicated as soon as the election result was beyond doubt that they would likely enter a coalition government with the Labour Party. Late on the night of 5 March 2011, at Dublin Castle, Fine Gael and Labour formally agreed to form a coalition government with Kenny as Taoiseach and Labour leader Eamon Gilmore as Tánaiste, with Labour being given four other seats in cabinet.

Kenny said that his first priority upon taking office would be to renegotiate the terms of the bailout for Ireland, calling the original deal "a bad deal for Ireland and a bad deal for Europe".

Taoiseach (2011–2017)

2011 

The members of the 31st Dáil convened for the first time on 9 March 2011, the Dáil elected Kenny as Taoiseach by a vote of 117–27. Kenny received his seal of office from President Mary McAleese. He also announced ministerial appointees to his Government on 9 March 2011. At just under 59 years and 11 months on accession, Kenny is the second-oldest person to have assumed the office for the first time, the oldest being Seán Lemass.

On 9 March 2011, Kenny appointed 15 junior Ministers. He also appointed a Minister for political reform, and sent a request to the Office of Public Works as to how he could address ministerial transport. On 15 March 2011, it was announced that only the current President, the Taoiseach, the Tánaiste and the Minister for Justice and Equality were to have Garda drivers. All other Ministers would have to make use of their own transport with a mileage allowance and a commercial chauffeur as an expense. There was no announcement as to the continuing engagement of three government jets. The media reported that this would reduce the ministerial motor vehicle transport bill to €7,000,000 annually, which is more than the combined annual tax contributions of 16,000 people on minimum wage.

Ministerial pay cuts 
In one of his first acts as Taoiseach, Kenny slashed his own pay by €14,000 (a reduction of 7%). The new government also decided to cut the pay of senior Ministers. The Taoiseach's pay was cut from €214,187 to €200,000. Tánaiste Eamon Gilmore's pay was cut from €197,486 to €184,405. Ministers' pay was reduced to €169,275 (from €181,283), while pay for Ministers of State was cut from €139,266 to €130,042. In another cost-cutting measure, Kenny asked the Gardai, the Departments of Justice and Transport, as well as the Office of Public Works, to come up with a plan to reduce the amount spent on transporting Ministers and their teams.

Financial and banking policy 
On 11 March 2011, his third day in office, Kenny attended his first European Council as Taoiseach, in Brussels. During that summit he engaged in a heated confrontation with President of France Nicolas Sarkozy (which Kenny termed "a Gallic spat") over Ireland's comparatively low 12.5% corporate tax rate, which EU leaders have frequently posited as a condition of more favourable terms for the Irish bailout. Kenny held firm on his refusal to alter the corporate tax, which he reiterated in his first Leaders' Questions the following week—also declaring his government's intention to withhold further state funds from Dublin banks until the EU agreed to new terms that forced banks' senior bondholders to share in the losses.

However, less than three weeks later on 31 March 2011, the Central Bank of Ireland published the results of its "stress tests" on Ireland's four surviving banks (Allied Irish Banks, Bank of Ireland, EBS, and Irish Life & Permanent) — indicating that the banks needed to raise an additional €24,000,000,000 to remain solvent. Despite his earlier promise, the government announced the same day that the state would supply the necessary funds to keep the banks afloat, with Kenny stating that seeking the money from bondholders would be neither "reasonable or logical".

Kenny was heavily criticised for his government's action, with the Irish Independent noting that "this is the fifth time Irish people have been told over the past couple of years it would be the last payout they would have to endure".

Nevertheless, the first national opinion poll since Kenny took office, published on 10 April 2011, showed that public support for Kenny's Fine Gael party had increased since the election from 36% to 39%, although a plurality also indicated deep dissatisfaction with his rescue of the banks.

On 21 July 2011, Kenny announced that an agreement had been reached by Eurozone leaders to reduce Ireland's interest rate by 2% and extend the repayment period.

Pension levy controversy 
On 9 May 2011, Kenny's government announced a new job creation program, along with plan to finance it via a 0.6% tax levy on private pension savings. Public pension funds, however, would remain untouched. The pension levy caused an immediate and intense outcry, leaving Kenny to defend the initiative as "a modest proposal" and refuting charges that the government would next tax personal savings. However, the controversy surrounding the levy intensified on 12 May 2011, when Kenny admitted that the holders of Approved Retirement Funds—most of whom were among the highest income earners in Ireland—would not be included in the levy.

Political reforms 
On 3 May 2011, Kenny's government approved a set of political reforms that adhered to promises he had made in the general election. Among the approved reforms were a binding Constituency Commission scheduled for June 2011, with the specific purpose of reducing the number of TDs by up to 20; an act to establish a six-month time limit for holding by-elections to the Dáil; a €750,000 spending limit in the 2011 presidential election; legislation to ban corporate donations, to be enacted by summer 2011; establishment of a Constitutional Convention in 2011, which was to include discussion of the future of the Seanad; and a referendum on its abolition, to be held in the second half of 2012. The promise to cut up to 20 TDs caused some controversy and scepticism, due to the Constitutional requirement that there be no less than one TD for every 30,000 people, which would necessitate a minimum of 150 TDs—meaning that the current number of 166 TDs could be reduced by 16 at most.

Vatican reprimand and response 

On 13 July 2011, the Cloyne Report was published, detailing the investigation into allegations of child sexual abuse by 19 priests in the Roman Catholic Diocese of Cloyne. Among the report's findings were the revelation that the vast majority of allegations made in the diocese were not reported to the Garda, as required by the Church's 1996 guidelines; that the Bishop of the Diocese, John Magee, and others had withheld full co-operation with the Government's investigation and had deliberately misrepresented his own response to the allegations; and that the Vatican itself had both refused to co-operate in the investigation and counselled the Diocese that the 1996 guidelines were not binding.

On 20 July 2011, Kenny condemned the Vatican for its role in the scandal, stating that the Church's role in obstructing the investigation was a serious infringement upon the sovereignty of Ireland and that the scandal revealed "the dysfunction, disconnection and elitism that dominates the culture of the Vatican to this day". He added that "the historic relationship between church and state in Ireland could not be the same again".

Kenny's attack on the Vatican was unprecedented by a high-level official in Ireland. The speech was widely regarded as extraordinary, with the Daily Mail commenting that the attack was "the first time that Ireland's Parliament has publicly castigated the Vatican instead of local church leaders during the country's 17 years of paedophile-priest scandals". The Guardian remarked that " the political classes have...lost their fear, namely of the once almighty Roman Catholic church."

On 3 September, the Holy See issued its response to Kenny's speech noting that "the accusation that the Holy See attempted "to frustrate an Inquiry in a sovereign, democratic republic as little as three years ago, not three decades ago", which Mr Kenny made no attempt to substantiate, is unfounded. Indeed, when asked, a Government spokesperson clarified that Mr. Kenny was not referring to any specific incident". The response added that "Those Reports [...] contain no evidence to suggest that the Holy See meddled in the internal affairs of the Irish State or, for that matter, was involved in the day-to-day management of Irish dioceses or religious congregations with respect to sexual abuse issues".

On the quoting of then Cardinal Ratzinger, the response notes that the quotation was taken from the Instruction on the Ecclesial Vocation of the Theologian, otherwise known as Donum Veritatis (The Gift of the Truth), published by the Congregation for the Doctrine of the Faith on 24 May 1990, and signed by the then Prefect and Secretary of the Congregation. Therefore, it is not a private text of the then Cardinal Ratzinger but an official document of the Congregation.

First national address 

Kenny gave a televised address to the nation on 4 December 2011, ahead of the delivery of the 2012 Irish budget. He warned that Budget 2012 "will be tough", and that "it has to be". He also said that it would move Ireland towards a manageable deficit of 3% of GDP by 2015. This was only the sixth time that a Taoiseach had addressed the nation, reflecting the gravity of the Irish economic condition, in what Kenny stressed were "exceptional" circumstances. The broadcast was the second-most watched television programme of 2011 in Ireland, attracting an audience of 1.2 million viewers.

2012

Time magazine cover 
In October 2012, Kenny became the first Taoiseach since Seán Lemass to be featured on the cover of Time magazine. The related article, entitled "The Celtic Comeback", "glows" about Kenny's performance as Taoiseach and says he is "underestimated" by the Irish public. Catherine Mayer, who wrote the article, described Kenny as "charming", "shrewd" and "extremely likeable". Mayer said that what she was really trying to see was "what was behind that likability". "In small groups he is much more fluent and compelling than he would appear to be were you to judge him from his big media set pieces. When cameras train on him he seems to freeze up, which is an interesting problem for somebody in that position. But when he's relaxed he's interesting and has a lot to say,” she said. In the article, Kenny says that "I've no interest in looking for credit or thanks. Providing a prosperous future for all our people, that's what drives me".

2013

Promissory notes 
In February 2013, a deal was reached with the European Central Bank, in relation to the promissory note used to bail out the former Anglo Irish Bank. Kenny described it as "a good day for the country and its people". He told the Dáil that, as a result of the changes, there would be a €20 billion reduction in the borrowing requirement of the National Treasury Management Agency in the years ahead, but also cautioned that the agreement was not a "silver bullet".

Magdalene Laundry apology 
On 19 February 2013, Kenny apologised in Dáil Éireann, on behalf of the State to the survivors of the Magdalene Laundries. The government also told the estimated 800 to 1,000 surviving Magdalene women that a compensation scheme would be set up for them. However, by February 2014, none of the 684 applicants had received their statutory old-age pensions or health care benefits promised.

Second national address 
To mark the end of the Troika bailout in December 2013, Kenny gave a second address to the nation, saying that the country was moving in the right direction, and that the economy was starting to recover.

2014

Resignations of Martin Callinan and Alan Shatter 
In March 2014, in response to reports that Garda stations were bugged, Kenny informed the Dáil that he had sent Brian Purcell, the Secretary General of the Department of Justice, to Garda Commissioner Martin Callinan, the day before Callinan's sudden departure from his role. Leader of the Opposition Micheál Martin said this meant Kenny had effectively "sacked" Callinan. Kenny also said that he had been personally briefed on Garda surveillance by his Attorney General Máire Whelan, as Whelan did not wish to speak of the matter over the telephone.

In May 2014, following the resignation of Minister for Justice and Equality Alan Shatter, support for Kenny and his party slumped at the local and European elections. Kenny was later to be seen doing some "happy dancing" at the annual Bloom Festival.

2015 
In March 2015, Kenny was criticised for his lack of understanding towards Wexford TD Mick Wallace's inability to speak Irish, during leader's questions in the Dáil.

In April 2015, Kenny told the Dáil a tale about a man with two pints in one hand. Leader of Sinn Féin Gerry Adams immediately quizzed him on this, saying: "Two pints in one hand?".

On 22 September 2015, Kenny controversially delayed leaders' questions in the Dáil so that he could open the Denis O'Brien-controlled Independent News & Media's new digital hub. Kenny had previously launched a book for James Morrissey, the long-term paid spokesperson for O'Brien.

A "punching gesture" made by Kenny as Mary Lou McDonald was speaking during a Dáil debate on the Budget on 13 October 2015, attracted public notice. McDonald later responded by saying, "a punching gesture is unusual behaviour to say the least and I would suggest not to be repeated".

Later that month, Kenny told a gathering of the European People's Party (EPP) in Madrid, that he had been instructed to have the army guarded ATMs, during the economic downturn. Opposition TDs wondered why he did not tell this to the banking inquiry and Kenny was accused of "telling a tall tale". Kenny himself later contradicted his own account by saying he had not received a specific briefing on the matter. A spokesman for Kenny later claimed it had been "informally discussed" in Government Buildings in early 2012, but that minutes had not been kept due to the sensitivity of the details therein.

2016 
On 3 February 2016, Kenny announced his intention to request that President Higgins dissolve the 31st Dáil. He told the Dáil before its dissolution that the 2016 general election would occur on Friday, 26 February.

At a Fine Gael rally in his home town of Castlebar, County Mayo, on 20 February 2016, Kenny informed an audience that his local constituents were All-Ireland champion "whingers". He later told media in Galway, that he was referring to local Fianna Fáil members.

Fine Gael won 50 seats in the 32nd Dáil, 29 short of an overall majority. Preliminary discussions took place with Leader of the Opposition Mícheál Martin, in order to agree on an arrangement to support either Kenny, Fine Gael or under a new leader to form a new government. On 10 March 2016, Kenny resigned as Taoiseach, after failing to win enough votes to be elected for a second term. He and the cabinet continued in a caretaker capacity until a new government was formed.

As caretaker Kenny went to Washington, D.C., as usual for Saint Patrick's Day. There he was reported as having told the Irish Embassy: "Bejaysus, I wish I didn't have to go back and face what I have to face". He also met President Barack Obama, as part of the annual visit of the Taoiseach to the White House, for the handing over of the bowl of shamrock.

On 29 April 2016, an agreement was reached with Fianna Fáil to allow a Fine Gael–led minority government, and on 6 May 2016, Kenny was elected Taoiseach again, by a margin of 59 to 49 votes (with 51 abstentions), and formed a government. He became the first member of Fine Gael to win re-election as Taoiseach in the party's history. Kenny also took over as Minister for Defence, from Simon Coveney, who was appointed Minister for Housing, Planning, Community and Local Government.

Regarding the United Kingdom European Union membership referendum, Kenny went on record as saying the possibility of a "Brexit" would cause a "serious difficulty" with maintaining peace in Northern Ireland. He was described as favouring Britain remaining in the European Union, for were Britain to leave the EU, the peace settlement in Northern Ireland might collapse. This statement was denounced by Theresa Villiers, the British Secretary of State for Northern Ireland, as "scaremongering of the worst possible kind"; she stated that the Common Travel Area, the "open border" encompassing the United Kingdom and Ireland, would not be affected by Britain's departure from the EU.

2017 

On 30 January 2017, a joint press meeting was held between Enda Kenny and British Prime Minister Theresa May, in Merrion Street, Dublin, to discuss the implications of Brexit on Northern Ireland and Ireland.

Subsequent to the 2016 general election, there were calls for him to step down as Leader of Fine Gael, and thus as Taoiseach. After the uncovering of the Garda smear campaign of sergeant Maurice McCabe, some backbench TDs lost confidence in Kenny. Kenny had stated he would indicate his plans for a leadership change following his return from the US for the traditional St. Patrick's Day celebrations; however, at the St. Patrick's Day parade in New York City, Kenny stated that he would not stand down from leadership until the issues of Brexit and the aftermath of the snap election in Northern Ireland had been resolved, saying that "you can't have a situation where you have no leadership in Northern Ireland and where we have to define from a European Union point of view where Ireland would be, what the agreed terms of reference for the [Brexit] negotiations are". He also remarked that he and Prime Minister May were in agreement that there would not be a return to direct rule from Westminster in Northern Ireland. On 20 March, Finance Minister Michael Noonan stated that Kenny should remain in office at least until June, when the next phase of EU Brexit negotiations was set to begin. The following day, Kenny announced that he would not consider standing down until May at the earliest, and that he planned to attend the European Council on 29 April 2017, to discuss strategy surrounding Brexit.

Viral St. Patrick's Day White House Speech 
Enda Kenny's speech about the value of immigration in front of then US president Donald Trump went viral in March 2017 and was widely praised. Mr Kenny’s address, which he delivered at a St Patrick’s Day event on Capitol Hill, made no reference to Mr Trump’s policies. However, it was interpreted in sections of the US and UK media as a thinly veiled criticism of Mr Trump’s plans to ban immigration from certain Muslim countries and to build a wall along the Mexican border.

The speech garnered much attention in the United States media. Occupy Democrats showcased the video on their Facebook page with the headline “Irish PM SCHOOLS Trump: ‘St Patrick Was An Immigrant’ Right to Trump’s face!”. Vox covered the story with a headline reading "Watch Ireland’s prime minister bash Trump’s anti-immigration views just feet away from Trump" while The New York Times reported the speech under the headline: "Irish Premier Uses St Patrick's Day Ritual to Lecture Trump on Immigration."

In his speech Mr Kenny said St Patrick was an immigrant and was, in many ways, the patron saint of immigrants along with being the patron saint of Ireland. "Four decades before Lady Liberty lifted her lamp, we were the wretched refuse on the teeming shore. We believed in the shelter of America, in the compassion of America, in the opportunity of America. We came and became Americans."

A video of a section of the speech was posted on the Channel 4 Facebook page on the morning of St Patrick's Day. The video clip went viral with over 30 million views in just two days.

United Ireland Clause 
During the Brexit negotiations of 2017, Enda Kenny insisted on the inclusion of a united Ireland clause. The text spelled out that in the event of a future unity referendum in Ireland, as envisaged by the Good Friday Agreement, Northern Ireland would automatically rejoin the European Union.

The British government attempted to block the insertion of the Irish unity clause into the text of an extraordinary summit of EU leaders at the end of April, with Irish officials being subjected to what one source described as 'a sustained diplomatic offensive' by Britain. Officials from the British Department for Exiting the EU tried to set up a phone call between Prime Minister Theresa May and Mr Kenny on the issue. However, the officials were told that the phone call would not happen, and that Mr Kenny was 'sticking to his guns'. Enda Kenny requested the clause and it was unanimously adopted by the other 26 member states. Political Editor Daniel McConnell argues that the specific mention of Irish unity, known as 'the Kenny text' in the Brexit talks agenda, was Kenny's crowning achievement.

Connacht GAA Centre of Excellence 
Enda Kenny was credited with making the world’s largest sports air dome, located just outside Knock, County Mayo, a financially feasible project. Though an indoor playing facility of some description was in the long-term plans when the sod was first turned at the facility in 2010, it wasn't until 2017 when the right path became clear thanks to the surprise visit of Kenny during his time in office.

Calling in for an unannounced look around, it was the Taoiseach who first suggested installing an air dome, similar to the one used by his local tennis club in Castlebar. That was the Eureka moment. Connacht GAA secretary John Prenty and Cathal Cregg, the provincial games manager based at the centre, executed on the idea.

As the groundworks were already in place, the structure, covering 15,000m2 in size, took just five employees and only one month to erect. The completed project includes a facility 26 metres in height at its highest point, 150m in length and 100m wide. It has a 30m running track on one side of the pitch with a capacity to insert seating for 600 people on the opposite side. Light, cameras and speakers are suspended against the structure right the way around. Costing just €3.1 million, the specifications alone scream value for money. This hasn't always been a given within GAA circles - the spiralling costs of Páirc Uí Chaoimh is just one comparable case though an array of other projects could be named as examples.

Playing opportunities are only the beginning for the air dome. With an ability to host 10,000 people in a concert setting, the dome is one of the largest indoor venues in the Ireland. It could host concerts, conferences, trade exhibitions and more. But it will be first and foremost a GAA facility that can pay for itself in the short- and long-term. "The opportunities are limitless," said Mr. Prenty.

Retirement 
On 17 May 2017, Kenny announced his intention to step down as party leader, effective at midnight. He requested that the party conclude the election of his successor by 2 June 2017, and said that he would step down as Taoiseach shortly thereafter. In the ensuing election, Minister for Social Protection Leo Varadkar was elected Leader of Fine Gael. In a statement, Kenny offered his "heartiest congratulations" to Varadkar, saying "this is a tremendous honour for him and I know he will devote his life to improving the lives of people across our country".

In early June 2017, Kenny made his final trip to the U.S. as Taoiseach. While in Chicago on 4 June 2017, he was in attendance at Soldier Field for Irish rock band U2's performance as part of their Joshua Tree Tour. U2 lead singer Bono dedicated their performance of the song "Trip Through Your Wires" to Kenny, saying "The man we call Taoiseach, which I think might mean head of the house or something like that... The chieftain of our country is here tonight! ...We’d like to honour our graceful leader."

On 13 June 2017, Kenny tendered his resignation as Taoiseach. The following day, 14 June 2017, he nominated Varadkar to formally succeed him as Taoiseach in the Dáil; the Dáil approved the nomination. Kenny then made his farewell address to the Dáil, quoting U.S. President Theodore Roosevelt: "Far and away, the best prize that life has to offer is a chance to work hard at work worth doing." After receiving a standing ovation from the Dáil, Kenny departed for Áras an Uachtaráin and submitted his resignation to President Michael D. Higgins. In his last duty as Taoiseach he advised the President that the Dáil had nominated Varadkar as Taoiseach, and that the President should thus invite him to form a new government and appoint him as Taoiseach in accordance with the constitution.

Return to the backbenches (2017–2020)
On 29 December 2017, Kenny was a wedding guest of Fine Gael Senator Jerry Buttimer in Cork. When a reporter took the opportunity to remind him of a nearby event centre of which Kenny had "turned the sod" nearly two years previously, but of which the construction was now halted, Kenny made it known he was there to attend a marriage.

In June 2018, Kenny was named 'Irish European of the Year' for "his outstanding contribution to promoting and developing Ireland's place in Europe through some of the most challenging circumstances in our history around the time of the Brexit referendum to also chairing the European Council and developing and promoting our relationship with the European Union".

In October 2019, RTÉ Investigates reported that Kenny had voted in the Dáil on just three occasions in 2019 (two of those votes taking place on the same day), and had missed 96% of votes that took place between June 2017 and July 2019. In total, he had voted just 15 times in that period out of a possible 400 votes. The report stated that Kenny's attendance in the Dáil had been registered on 263 days during that period, and that he had claimed the full travel and accommodation allowance of €47,000 to which he was entitled, in addition to his salary.

Post-political activity

Iarnród Enda (2021)
He presented a six part Irish language television series about old Irish railway routes on RTÉ One in 2021, called Iarnród Enda. It commenced broadcasting on Monday 5 April 2021.

Other activity 
In 2019, Kenny was appointed chair of the global advisory board of Dublin private equity firm Venturewave Capital. In August 2021, Kenny joined the board of Heneghan Strategic Communications, the lobbying and public relations agency run by Nigel Heneghan. In September 2021, he joined the board of Dublin-headquartered ‘mechanical tree’ firm Carbon Collect as a non-executive director.

Legacy
Kenny left a lasting impact on his Fine Gael party. He is the only person in modern Irish politics to take control of a major political party from the back benches. When he became Fine Gael party leader in 2002, Fine Gael had won just 31 seats in the previous 2002 general election, 23 seats fewer than the 1997 general election. Under his leadership, Kenny grew the party in every election he contested (general, local and European) until his last general election in 2016. This run included winning 76 seats in the 2011 general election, a gain of 45 seats from when he took over the party leadership in 2002. This significant gain resulted in Fine Gael becoming the largest party in Dáil Éireann for the first time in its 78-year history. The 2011 general election victory also included an historic 4 out of 5 seats won by Fine Gael candidates in Kenny's Mayo constituency (with Kenny himself topping the poll). This had never been achieved by any political party in a 5 seat constituency before. According to political pundit Kevin Doyle, 'everyone in the party recognises that he leaves it in a toe-to-toe battle with Fianna Fáil ahead. When he took over they weren’t even at the races.'

Kenny's tenure as Taoiseach was dominated by the introduction of austerity policies in the aftermath of the economic recession. These policies began under the previous Fianna Fáil government in 2008, and continued for much of his first term. Overall, the impact of these budgets has been described as not conforming to "either a progressive pattern (losses increasing with income) or regressive pattern (losses declining with income)" by the Economic and Social Research Institute.

Despite the economic climate in which he took over, for many political pundits including Fergus Finlay and David Davin-Power, Kenny ranks high on the list of the greatest Taoisigh of all time. During his time in office, Kenny's government regained Irish sovereignty after one of the worst economic crises in Irish history. When Kenny took office as Taoiseach in 2011, the unemployment rate for the State on a Principal Economic Status basis was 19%. By the time he stepped down as Taoiseach in 2017 the unemployment rate was just 6.4%. In a similar vein, in Kenny's first year in office Irish emigration levels reached 87,100 people per year. When he stepped down in 2017 this figure had reduced by nearly 30% to 64,800 people. Fewer than half of those emigrating in 2017 were Irish nationals. Kenny also oversaw a reduction of €28,837 in the Taoiseach's salary in two separate cuts. He sold the state owned jet and cut Garda drivers for his own cabinet ministers and for all retired Taoisigh. During the 2011 election campaign Mr Kenny vowed to make Ireland the best small country in the world to do business. By the end of his tenure as Taoiseach, various studies suggested that Ireland, even if not the best in the world, at least ranked very highly in this regard. When Enda Kenny stepped down, Ireland had the fastest growing economy in Europe.

Several major and lasting societal events also took place during his tenure. The state apology to the Magdalene Women, Kenny's speech in the Dáil after the publication of the Cloyne Report (which pundits acknowledge changed the relationship between Church and State forever), the marriage equality referendum and the children’s rights referendum are all noteworthy achievements that will have a lasting impact on the Irish State.

Enda Kenny's insistence on the inclusion of a united Ireland clause in the Brexit negotiations could leave a lasting impact on the island of Ireland. Political Editor Daniel McConnell argues that the specific mention of Irish unity, known as 'the Kenny text' in the Brexit talks agenda, was Kenny's crowning achievement.  The text spelled out that in the event of a future unity referendum in Ireland, as envisaged by the Good Friday Agreement, Northern Ireland would automatically rejoin the European Union.

When Kenny stepped down he was the longest serving Fine Gael Taoiseach.

Political journalist John Downing wrote a biography of Kenny titled Enda Kenny: The Unlikely Taoiseach.

Kenny is credited with making the world’s largest sports air dome, located just outside Knock, County Mayo, a financially feasible project.

Personal life
Kenny has been married to Fionnuala O'Kelly since 1992. She has been described by the media as his "secret weapon". O'Kelly is a first cousin to sitting Fine Gael MEP Seán Kelly, who also served as a President of the Gaelic Athletic Association (GAA). The O'Kelly family originally come from the parish of Kilcummin near Killarney, County Kerry. The couple have three children: one daughter, Aoibhinn, and two sons, Ferdia and Naoise. The couple met in Leinster House, where O'Kelly worked as a press officer for Fianna Fáil. She later worked with Raidió Teilifís Éireann (RTÉ).

Kenny has climbed Mount Kilimanjaro and completed the Ring of Kerry Charity Cycle. He is a keen supporter of his native Mayo GAA football team, and played football for his local club, Islandeady GAA, of which he is the current club president. His father Henry, won an All-Ireland medal with the county team in 1936. His grandfather was a lighthouse keeper.

In February 2023, a spokesperson for Kenny announced he had been diagnosed with cancer. Kenny had underwent a medical procedure to treat the cancer and was expected to make a full recovery.

See also
Families in the Oireachtas

References

External links

Enda Kenny's page on the Fine Gael website 

|-

|-

|-

|-

|-

|-

|-

|-

|-

|-

 
1951 births
Living people
Alumni of St Patrick's College, Dublin
Alumni of the University of Galway
Fine Gael TDs
Irish schoolteachers
Leaders of Fine Gael
Local councillors in County Mayo
Members of the 20th Dáil
Members of the 21st Dáil
Members of the 22nd Dáil
Members of the 23rd Dáil
Members of the 24th Dáil
Members of the 25th Dáil
Members of the 26th Dáil
Members of the 27th Dáil
Members of the 28th Dáil
Members of the 29th Dáil
Members of the 30th Dáil
Members of the 31st Dáil
Members of the 32nd Dáil
Ministers of State of the 24th Dáil
People from Castlebar
Politicians from County Mayo
Taoisigh
People educated at St Gerald's College, Castlebar